A performative contradiction arises when the propositional content of a statement contradicts the presuppositions of asserting it. An example of a performative contradiction is the statement "I am dead" because the very act of proposing it presupposes the actor is alive.

Jürgen Habermas points out that statements spoken during justificatory argumentation carry additional presuppositions and so certain statements are performative contradictions in this context. Habermas claims that post-modernism's epistemological relativism suffers from a performative contradiction. Hans-Hermann Hoppe claims in his theory of discourse ethics that arguing against self-ownership results in a performative contradiction. Jaakko Hintikka more rigorously fleshed out the notion of performative contradiction in analyzing Descartes' famous cogito ergo sum argument, concluding that cogito ergo sum relies on performance rather than logical inference.

See also 
Liar paradox
Performative utterance
Self-refuting idea

References

Further reading 
 
 

Paradoxes
Philosophy of language
Grammar
Jürgen Habermas